Jaedae District is one of 16 districts located in Sinoe County, Liberia. As of 2008, it had a population of 3,617.

References

Districts of Liberia
Sinoe County